Methaqualone is a hypnotic sedative.  It was sold under the brand names Quaalude and Sopor among others, which contained 300 mg of methaqualone, and sold as a combination drug under the brand name Mandrax, which contained 250 mg methaqualone and 25 mg diphenhydramine within the same tablet, mostly in Europe. Commercial production of methaqualone was halted in the mid-1980s due to widespread abuse and addictiveness. It is a member of the quinazolinone class.

The sedative–hypnotic activity of methaqualone was first noted in 1955. In 1962, methaqualone was patented in the United States by Wallace and Tiernan. Its use peaked in the early 1970s for the treatment of insomnia, and as a sedative and muscle relaxant.

Methaqualone became increasingly popular as a recreational drug and club drug in the late 1960s and 1970s, known variously as "ludes" or "disco biscuits"  due to its widespread use during the popularity of disco in the 1970s, or "sopers" (also "soaps") in the United States and Canada, and "mandrakes" and "mandies" in the United Kingdom, Australia and New Zealand. The substance was sold both as a free base and as a salt (hydrochloride). This use means the drug is controlled in most countries, and is so under Schedule II of the United Nations Convention on Psychotropic Substances.

Medical use 
Methaqualone is a sedative that increases the activity of the GABA receptors in the brain and nervous system, similarly to benzodiazepines and barbiturates. When GABA activity is increased, blood pressure drops and breathing and pulse rates slow, leading to a state of deep relaxation. These properties explain why methaqualone was originally mainly prescribed for insomnia.

Methaqualone was not recommended for use while pregnant and is in pregnancy category D.

Overdose 

An overdose can lead to nervous system shutdown, coma and death.
Additional effects are delirium, convulsions, hypertonia, hyperreflexia, vomiting, kidney failure, coma, and death through cardiac or respiratory arrest. It resembles barbiturate poisoning, but with increased motor difficulties and a lower incidence of cardiac or respiratory depression.
The standard single tablet adult dose of Quaalude brand of methaqualone was 300 mg when made by Lemmon. A dose of 8000 mg is lethal and a dose as little as 2000 mg could induce a coma if taken with an alcoholic beverage.

Pharmacology 
Methaqualone peaks in the bloodstream within several hours, with a half-life of 20–60 hours. While the salt methaqualone hydrochloride is typically used clinically, methaqualone free-base was also marketed, namely as the methaqualone component of Mandrax, a combination drug which contained 250 mg methaqualone and 25 mg diphenhydramine within the same tablet. Oral dosage forms of methaqualone hydrochloride were manufactured as capsules, whereas oral dosage forms of methaqualone free-base were manufactured as tablets.

Regular users build up a physical tolerance, requiring larger doses for the same effect.

History 
Methaqualone was first synthesized in India in 1951 by Indra Kishore Kacker and Syed Husain Zaheer, who were conducting research on finding new antimalarial medications. By 1965, it was the most commonly prescribed sedative in Britain, where it has been sold legally under the names Malsed, Malsedin, and Renoval. In 1965, a methaqualone/antihistamine combination was sold as the sedative drug Mandrax in Europe, by Roussel Laboratories (now part of Sanofi S.A.). In 1972, it was the sixth-bestselling sedative in the US, where it was legal under the brand name Quaalude. 

Quaalude in the United States was originally manufactured in 1965 by the Fort Washington, Pennsylvania, based pharmaceutical firm William H. Rorer, Inc. The drug name "Quaalude" is a portmanteau, combining the words "quiet interlude" and shared a stylistic reference to another drug marketed by the firm, Maalox.

In 1978, Rorer sold the rights to manufacture Quaalude to the Lemmon Company of Sellersville, Pennsylvania. At that time, Rorer chairman John Eckman commented on Quaalude's bad reputation stemming from illegal manufacture and use of methaqualone, and illegal sale and use of legally prescribed Quaalude: "Quaalude accounted for less than 2% of our sales, but created 98% of our headaches." 

Both companies still regarded Quaalude as an excellent sleeping drug. Lemmon, well aware of Quaalude's public image problems, used advertisements in medical journals to urge physicians "not to permit the abuses of illegal users to deprive a legitimate patient of the drug". Lemmon also marketed a small quantity under another name, Mequin, so doctors could prescribe the drug without the negative connotations. 

The rights to Quaalude were held by the JB Roerig & Company division of Pfizer, before the drug was discontinued in the United States in 1985, mainly due to its psychological addictiveness, widespread abuse, and illegal recreational use.

Society and culture

Brand names 
It was sold under the brand name Quaalude and sometimes stylized "Quāālude" in the United States and Canada, and Mandrax in the UK, South Africa, and Australia.

Regulation 
Methaqualone was initially placed in Schedule I as defined by the UN Convention on Psychotropic Substances, but was moved to Schedule II in 1979.

In Canada, methaqualone is listed in Schedule III of the Controlled Drugs and Substances Act and requires a prescription, but it is no longer manufactured. Methaqualone is banned in India.

In the United States it was withdrawn from the market in 1983 and made a Schedule I drug in 1984.

Recreational 

Methaqualone became increasingly popular as a recreational drug in the late 1960s and 1970s, known variously as "ludes" or "sopers" (also "soaps") in the United States and "mandrakes" and "mandies" in the UK, Australia and New Zealand. Sopor is a Latin word for sleep.

The drug was more tightly regulated in Britain under the Misuse of Drugs Act 1971 and in the U.S. from 1973. It was withdrawn from many developed markets in the early 1980s. In the United States it was withdrawn in 1983 and made a Schedule I drug in 1984. It has a DEA ACSCN of 2565 and in 2022 the aggregate annual manufacturing quota for the United States was 60 grams. 

Mention of its possible use in some types of cancer and AIDS treatments has periodically appeared in the literature since the late 1980s. Research does not appear to have reached an advanced stage. The DEA has also added the methaqualone analogue mecloqualone (also a result of some incomplete clandestine syntheses) to Schedule I as ACSCN 2572, with a manufacturing quota of 30 g.

Gene Haislip, the former head of the Chemical Control Division of the Drug Enforcement Administration (DEA), told the PBS documentary program Frontline, "We beat 'em." By working with governments and manufacturers around the world, the DEA was able to halt production and, Haislip said, "eliminated the problem". Methaqualone was manufactured in the United States under the name Quaalude by the pharmaceutical firms Rorer and Lemmon with the numbers 714 stamped on the tablet, so people often referred to Quaalude as 714's, "Lemmons", or "Lemmon 7's". 

Methaqualone was also manufactured in the US under the trade names Sopor and Parest. After the legal manufacture of the drug ended in the United States in 1982, underground laboratories in Mexico continued the illegal manufacture of methaqualone throughout the 1980s, continuing the use of the "714" stamp, until their popularity waned in the early 1990s. Drugs purported to be methaqualone are in a significant majority of cases found to be inert, or contain diphenhydramine or benzodiazepines.

Illicit methaqualone is one of the most commonly used recreational drugs in South Africa. Manufactured clandestinely, often in India, it comes in tablet form, but is smoked with marijuana. This method of ingestion is known as "white pipe". It is popular elsewhere in Africa and in India.

Chemical weapon – Project Coast 

Illegal efforts to weaponize methaqualone have occurred. During the 1980s, the apartheid regime in South Africa ordered the covert manufacture of a large amount of methaqualone at the front company Delta G Scientific Company, as part of a secret chemical weapons programme known as Project Coast. Methaqualone was given the codename MosRefCat (Mossgas Refinery Catalyst). Details of this activity came to light during the 1998 hearings of the post-apartheid Truth and Reconciliation Commission.

Sexual assault 

Actor Bill Cosby admitted in court to giving Quaalude to women before engaging in sexual activity with them. Roman Polanski, a film director, was accused of administering quaaludes to a 13-year-old girl before sexually assaulting her.

Popular culture 
Quaalude has been referenced in the 2013 film The Wolf of Wall Street. Season 18 of Law & Order: Special Victims Unit addresses Quaalude administration as a date rape drug on episode 9, "Decline and Fall", aired in early 2017.

References

Further reading

External links 

 Erowid Vault – Methaqualone (Quaaludes)

GABAA receptor positive allosteric modulators
Quinazolinones
Sedatives
Hypnotics
Amidines
Withdrawn drugs